Traditional Japanese music is the folk or traditional music of Japan. Outside of ethnomusicology, however,  usually refers to Japanese music from around the 17th to the mid-19th century. Within this framework, there are three types of traditional music in Japan: theatrical, court music, and instrumental.

Theatrical
Japan has several theatrical forms of drama in which music plays a significant role. The main forms are kabuki and Noh.

Noh
 or  music is a type of theatrical music used in Noh theatre. Noh music is played by an instrumental ensemble called .

Kabuki
 is a type of Japanese theatre known for its highly stylized dancing and singing as well as the elaborate make-up worn by the predominately all-male cast.

Typically there are multiple  singers singing together. The second type is called . It involves  music without any singing.

,  and  accompany dancing in kabuki.  basically recites the parts of the play concerning scenery.

It involves singers, called , and  players, called . The  use  (thin neck)  which produce high pitched tones and are capable of producing delicate melodies.

 consists of reciters called  and  that use  (medium-neck) .  is similar to  music but is slower-paced and more solemn.  is also performed onstage.

However, in  words and sentences full of emotion are recited in very high-pitched tones.

and 
 and  describe the distinctive sounds made by striking two square oak boards. When the two boards are struck together, they produce the  sound. When they are struck against a hardwood board, they produce the  sound.

Court music

 is court music, and is the oldest traditional music in Japan. It was usually patronized by the Imperial Court or the shrines and temples.  music includes songs, dances, and a mixture of other Asian music.  has two styles; these are instrumental music  and vocal music .

Since  means "elegance",  literally means elegant music and generally refers to musical instruments and music theory imported into Japan from China and Korea from 500 to 600 CE.  is divided into two main categories: Old Music and New Music. Old Music refers to music and musical compositions from before the Chinese Tang dynasty (618–906). New Music refers to music and compositions produced during or after Tang, including music brought from various regions of China and Korea.

Instrumental Music
—a Chinese form of music
—influenced by Tang dynasty China and Balhae

Vocal Music
— song 
— song
—entertainment of Eastern Japan
—vocal Japanese court music
—songs based on Chinese poems

is a kind of Buddhist chanting of sutra syllabically or melismatically set to melodic phrasing, usually performed by a male chorus.  came from India, and it began in Japan in the Nara period.  is sung a capella by one or more Buddhist monks.

The two characters ( and ) translate literally as "voice" and "clear" respectively.  is a translation of the Sanskrit word , which means "the (linguistic) study of language".

There are four main  styles. These are centuries-old traditions which continue today:
—during the Edo period,  began to play  in Osaka.
— began to play this for kabuki dances in Edo (Toko) in 1814 during the late Edo period. He played  style at first, before moving from playing this style to the  style. This style is light, refreshingly unrestrained, and chic.
—in the middle of the Edo period,  began to play this for kabuki.

There are other four  styles which have largely died out. It is not  but is like .

—during the Edo period,  (1684–1725) began to play in an original style in 1717. It is heavy.
 or —during the Edo period,  began to play this style in Kyoto.  is a modest style.
—During the Edo period,  (1716–1764) began to play this style. He played the  style at first and then changed to play in the  style.

There are three styles of : one for kabuki dance, one for kabuki plays (dialogue), and one for music unconnected with kabuki.

(died 1787) began to play this style, having first played in the  style. He moved from playing this style to play in the  style. Ogie Royuu I had a beautiful but small voice. In a theater a voice with volume was important, so Ogie Royuu I stopped singing in the theater. Ogie Royuu I began to play in the Yoshiwara (red-light district).  declined after 1818.  composed new  pieces at the end of the Edo period. Yamazaburou was an owner of a parlor house in the red-light district of Yoshiwara. Yamazaburou knew music very well. Tamaya Yamazaburou's pieces are influenced by  music.  re-established . Kizaemon changed his name to Ogie Royuu IV in 1876 or 1879. ( usually means a musical piece or musical number in modern Japanese.)
 is old music from the Edo period. Not many players perform  and those who do are elderly; there are few young musicians playing this music.

music
 music began in the Edo period.

uses the Japanese , which differs from the Chinese .
—originating in Western Japan, the  style uses pointed oval-shaped plectra. The repertoire consists of classical pieces composed during the Edo period. This style contains more pieces that accompany singing.
—originating in Eastern Japan, the  style uses a square-shaped plectra.

Traditional music in modern culture
Traditional Japanese musicians sometimes collaborate with modern Western musicians. Also, musicians create new styles of Japanese music influenced by the West but still use traditional musical instruments.

Traditional musical instruments

Chordophones

Aerophones

Membranophones

Idiophones

Traditional cultural events
Kabuki
Noh

Geisha

Artists
Yoshida Brothers
Rin'

See also
Music of Japan
Culture of Japan
Shinto
Buddhism in Japan
Religion in Japan
History of Japan

References

External links
Japan Guide
Nipponia
Shamisen with DJ
Yoshida Brothers' "Kodo"
Yoshida Brothers' official website
Yoshida Kyōdai's official website
"Venerated Patterns of China and Japan" (CD)
History of Japanese Traditional Music at Nippon Columbia